Wisk Aero is an aerospace manufacturer based in Mountain View, California, United States. The company develops self-flying electric vertical take off and landing (eVTOL) aircraft designed to be operated as air taxis. The company was formed in 2019 as a partnership between Boeing and Google co-founder Larry Page's Kitty Hawk aircraft company.

History 
Wisk Aero's predecessor, Zee Aero, was founded in 2010 with backing from Google's co-founder Larry Page. In 2017, Zee Aero was merged with Kitty Hawk, which made an ultralight aircraft that could take off vertically over open water. In March 2018, Kitty Hawk rebranded its Zee.Aero group as Cora.

On June 25, 2019, Kitty Hawk announced a partnership with Boeing, to combine Cora innovations with Boeing's scale and aerospace expertise. In December, the Cora team was rebranded and spun off as a separate company called Wisk Aero.  The company was headquartered in Mountain View, California, and its CEO was Gary Gysin.

In January 2020, Wisk CEO Gary Gysin announced that their vehicles would be completely self-flying. In February, Wisk became the first partner of the New Zealand Government's Airspace Integration Trials programme, designed to facilitate the safe testing, development and market validation of advanced unmanned aircraft. In November 2020, Wisk Aero joined NASA's Advanced Air Mobility Project, as part of NASA's Aeronautics Research Mission Directorate, in conjunction with the Federal Aviation Administration (FAA), to test how new vehicles interact with other air traffic.

On April 6, 2021, Wisk Aero filed a lawsuit against rival air taxi startup Archer Aviation, alleging theft of trade secrets. In May, Wisk Aero announced a partnership with Blade Urban Air Mobility to operate 30 of Wisk Aero's Cora eVTOLs on Blade's US network of terminals.  Wisk Aero's Cora would be added to Blade's private air service digital platform, with Wisk Aero to be compensated based on flight time. In July, Wisk Aero was one of several vendors named to participate in NASA's National Campaign (NC-1) to conduct operational flight demonstrations in urban environments. In August, Archer Aviation countersued Wisk Aero for $1 billion in damages, claiming that Wisk Aero's earlier lawsuit prevented Archer from raising capital.

In January 2022, Wisk Aero announced a $450 million investment by Boeing, to further develop pilot-less flying taxis.  At the time of the funding, Boeing announced its goal was to have Wisk's sixth generation passenger vehicle be the first autonomous passenger-carrying vehicle to be certified in the United States, to be presented for certification around 2028. In February, the company began working with the Long Beach Economic Partnership (LBEP) in the city of Long Beach, California to begin planning for the introduction of autonomous flight service in the city. On April 17, the company was one of several companies featured in a 60 Minutes segment on eVTOLs hosted by Anderson Cooper.

Products

Wisk Aero develops self-flying eVTOL aircraft. Its flagship model is the Wisk Cora, a two-passenger all-electric self-piloted aircraft. It has an experimental airworthiness certificate from the New Zealand Civil Aviation Authority (CAA) and the United States FAA.

As of April 2021, there were five different versions of Cora, with a sixth under development.

See also 
 Electric aircraft
 Urban air mobility
 VTOL

References

External links 
 Official website

Aircraft manufacturers of the United States
VTOL aircraft
Electric aircraft
Companies based in California
Transport companies established in 2019